Warner's Ranch, near Warner Springs, California, was notable as a way station for large numbers of emigrants on the Southern Emigrant Trail from 1849 to 1861, as it was a stop on both the Gila River Trail and the Butterfield Overland Mail stagecoach line (1859-1861). It was also operated as a pioneering cattle ranch.

The  property, with two original adobe buildings from 1849 and 1857, was declared a California Historical Landmark in 1939, and a National Historic Landmark in 1961. There is evidence that travelers stayed at the original 1849 ranch house.

History
This area had long been inhabited by the Cupeño American Indians, who first encountered Europeans when Spanish missionaries arrived in the area.  The Cupeño were forced into the colonial mission system and over time lost control of their land, although under Mexican law they were supposed to receive rights to land which they tilled and settled.  They continued to live and work in the area, however.

In 1830, Juan José Warner (born John Trumball Warner) left Connecticut and headed to California, passing through this valley.  He worked as a fur trader and merchant in Los Angeles.  By 1844, he had become a naturalized Mexican citizen and changed his name to Juan José.  He received the Rancho San Jose del Valle Mexican land grant. Warner established a successful trading post there in the San José Valley, and purchased cattle from Rancho Santa Margarita; this lasted until 1851.

On December 2, 1846, Stephen Watts Kearney, with a small command from New Mexico, reached the ranch on what proved to be his way to the Battle of San Pasqual.  He was later followed by the Mormon Battalion, that was establishing the route of Cooke's Wagon Road from New Mexico to California.

More importantly, from 1849-1851, Warner operated part of the ranch to serve travelers on the Gila River Emigrant Trail (part of the Southern Emigrant Trail).  He opened the only trading post between New Mexico and Los Angeles on a wagon road developed after the Mexican–American War.  Thousands of emigrants began flowing to California.  This trail later was used by the Butterfield Overland Mail stagecoach line, from 1857-1861.

When California became part of the United States, new obligations for taxes were applied to the Cupeño.  Many of them worked on the Warner ranch, which had a negative reputation for severe treatment of Indians.  In 1851, at the beginning of the Garra Revolt, an uprising by the local Cupeño tribe under Antonio Garra, Warner was attacked at his ranch.  He sent his family to Los Angeles.  Some of the ranch buildings were burned, but Warner continued to operate it, until his grant was challenged by a former claimant. 

Warner's Ranch was a stop on the San Antonio-San Diego Mail Line in 1857 and the Butterfield Overland Mail stagecoach line between 1858 and 1860.  It was linked to San Diego by the San Diego - Fort Yuma mail route via the road through Santa Isabel to San Diego.  Travelers rested here along their journey, after the trip through the desert.

During the American Civil War, Union troops established Camp Wright on the grounds of Warner's Ranch on October 18, 1861. The installation was designed to protect California from attack along the route of the emigrant travel route between Arizona and California.

The ranch passed through several hands until in 1880, John G. Downey, former governor of California, became sole owner of Warner's Ranch. He started legal efforts in 1892 to evict the Cupeño.  They challenged his actions under provisions of Mexican and United States law, but lost their case in the U.S. Supreme Court in 1901. The court ruled they were correct in their assessment of rights to the land, but had waited too long to press their claim.  The case was followed closely by many citizens who had sympathy for the Cupeño. They tried to purchase their own land but were unable to raise sufficient funds.  The local tribe was relocated to Pala Indian Reservation on May 12, 1903.

The first advertising for the hot springs was in 1894.  Gradually a resort was developed, called Warner Hot Springs, which became popular in the 1950s.

The ranch house was designated a National Historic Landmark in 1961. The  property holds the now-restored 1849 adobe ranch house and the Restored 1857 Carillo Adobe and barn which was the original Butterfield Stage Station and Trading Post.

Today

The historic portion includes an adobe ranch house and barn. The Ranch House has been restored and open to the public on weekends 12PM to 4PM and by appointment.

References

External links

 Flanigan, Kathleen, The Ranch House at Warner’s, The Journal of San Diego History, SAN DIEGO HISTORICAL SOCIETY QUARTERLY, Fall 1996, Volume 42, Number 4 from sandiegohistory.org. 
Photo of the Warner Stage Station in San Felipe Valley, San Diego County, from USC Digital Library
Warners Ranch Butterfield Stage Station location, on USGS 1:24K topographic map Warners Ranch, CA, view from TopoQuest
Camp Wright
Warner Springs Resort

Cupeno
Buildings and structures in San Diego County, California
Adobe buildings and structures in California
History of San Diego County, California
Butterfield Overland Mail in California
San Antonio–San Diego Mail Line
California Historical Landmarks
National Historic Landmarks in California
National Register of Historic Places in San Diego County, California
Tourist attractions in San Diego County, California
Historic American Buildings Survey in California
American frontier
Mexican California
1844 establishments in Alta California
Stagecoach stops in the United States